Pterochelus is a genus of sea snails, marine gastropod mollusks in the family Muricidae, the murex snails or rock snails.

Species
Species within the genus Pterochelus include:

 Pterochelus acanthopterus (Lamarck, 1816)
 Pterochelus akation (Vokes, 1993)
 Pterochelus ariomus (Clench & Farfante, 1945)
 Pterochelus duffusi Iredale, 1936
 Pterochelus triformis (Reeve, 1845)
 Pterochelus undosus (Vokes, 1993)
 Pterochelus westralis (Ponder & Wilson, 1973)

References

Muricinae
Gastropod genera
Gastropods described in 1880
Taxa named by Félix Pierre Jousseaume